Plopsaland De Panne is a theme park located in Adinkerke, Belgium - part of the municipality De Panne - owned and operated by Plopsa. The park reopened on 20 April 2000, before that the park was known as Meli Park from 1935 until 1999.

History

Meli Park 

In 1935, Alberic-Joseph Florizoone opened Meli Park, a place where he could sell his own produced honey, but also teach the visitors about the process and the bee itself. Over the years - to keep up with competition - the park opened several attractions, turning it into a theme park.

Plopsaland 
The family Florizoone sold the park in 1999 to Studio 100 and VMMa. The park received a make-over during the following winter season, to reopen as Plopsaland on 20 April 2000. During the renovation several characters from Studio 100 were used - such as Samson en Gert and Kabouter Plop - to theme new and old attractions. The new park had some issues at the reopening with parking capacity and catering, these issues were fixed in the following years.

Studio 100/Plopsa bought out the shares of VVMa in 2005 and became sole owner of the park, with plans to turn it into a multi-day, all-weather resort. In that same year, Plopsa opened Plopsa Indoor Hasselt and bought Telecoo, to avoid confusion with the other parks Plopsaland was renamed to Plopsaland De Panne.

Besides expanding the site into a resort, Plopsa also kept expanding the theme park with Anubis the Ride (2009), Vic the Vicking-land (2013), Heidi the Ride (2017) and The Ride to Happiness (2021) in order to appeal to a wider demographic and become a destination not just for families with younger children.

Attractions 
The park consists of 52 attractions, including 6 rollercoasters.

Rollercoasters

Other attractions

Mayaland Indoor 
Mayaland indoor is an indoor theme park that during the winterseason can be visited separately when the rest of the park is closed.

De Panne resort 

The theme park is part of the larger Plopsa resort that consist of an indoor theme park (2011), the Proximus Theater (2013), Plopsaqua De Panne (2015), a hotel (2021) and a camping (2021/2022). The resort also houses the headquarters of the Plopsa-group.

Visitor numbers 
Below is an overview of the development of Plopsaland visitor numbers, as stated in the annual report.

Future 
In 2022, Plopsaland will open Circus Bumba, an indoor hall that will house a dark ride, theater and several carnival type attractions.

Trivia 

 The name Plopsaland is an aggregation of the first two Studio 100 characters Plop and Samson. Another name that the new owners thought of was Pannadine after the town De Panne, this name was abandoned after the new owners discovered it was a medical creme.
 From 2000 until 2012 the park - and the other parks of the group - had Koning Plopsa as icon. In recent years the character was taken out of the logo's, parkshows and as a walk-around character. At various places around the resort the icon can still be found.

References

External links 
 Plopsaland Official Website

Amusement parks in Belgium
2000 establishments in Belgium
Buildings and structures in West Flanders
Tourist attractions in West Flanders
De Panne
Amusement parks opened in 2000
21st-century architecture in Belgium